Chaminade College Preparatory School may refer to:

 Chaminade College Preparatory School (California), United States
 Chaminade College Preparatory School (Missouri), United States